James Stallworth may refer to:

 James Adams Stallworth (1822–1861), U.S. Representative from Alabama
 James Stallworth (athlete) (born 1971), American track and field athlete